Armiansk is a railway station in Armiansk, Crimea, a territory recognized by a majority of countries as part of Ukraine, but de facto under control and administration of Russia.

History
The station was opened in 1935 as a terminus on the Dzhankoy—Armiansk line, but later the line was upgraded to Kherson.

After Crimea was annexed by Russia in 2014 all passenger services between Armiansk and Vadym railway station in Kherson Oblast were suspended. Southbound passenger services from Kherson now terminate at Vadym, 7–8 km north from Armiansk checkpoint.

Trains
After 2014 there is only 1 train, that terminates at this station:
 Armiansk—Feodosia

References

External links
 Train times on Yandex

Railway stations in Crimea
Railway stations in Russia opened in 1935